The 1974–75 season of the European Cup Winners' Cup club football tournament was won by Dynamo Kyiv in a convincing final victory against Ferencváros. It was the first of two Cup Winners' Cup successes for the club.

First round 

 
 

|}

Enosis Neon Paralimni withdrew due to the political situation in Cyprus.

First leg

Second leg
Dundee United won 3–2 on aggregate.

Dynamo Kyiv won 2–0 on aggregate.

Bologna 3–3 Gwardia Warszawa on aggregate. Gwardia Warszawa won 5–3 on penalties.

Red Star Belgrade won 2–1 on aggregate.

Second round 

|}

First leg

Second leg

Dynamo Kyiv won 5–3 on aggregate.

Red Star Belgrade won 11–2 on aggregate.

Quarter-finals 

|}

First leg

Second leg

Dynamo Kyiv won 3–0 on aggregate.

Red Star Belgrade 2–2 Real Madrid on aggregate. Red Star Belgrade won 6–5 on penalties.

Semi-finals 

|}

First leg

Second leg

Dynamo Kyiv won 4–2 on aggregate.

Ferencváros won 4–3 on aggregate.

Final

See also
1974–75 European Cup
1974–75 UEFA Cup

External links 
 1974–75 competition at UEFA website
 1974–75 Cup Winners' Cup results at Rec.Sport.Soccer Statistics Foundation
  Cup Winners Cup Seasons 1974-75 – results, protocols
 website Football Archive  1974–75 Cup Winners Cup

3
UEFA Cup Winners' Cup seasons